José or Jose Antonio García may refer to:
José Antonio García (journalist), Mexican journalist and editor
José Antonio Garcia (sound mixer), Academy Award nominated sound mixer
José Antonio García Belaúnde (born 1948), Peruvian career diplomat
Joe Garcia (born José Antonio Garcia Jr., 1963), American politician
José García Calvo (born 1975), Spanish retired footballer
Toni García (footballer, born 1976) (born 1976), Spanish footballer
Verza (born 1986), Spanish footballer
José Antonio García Fernández (born 1992), Mexican footballer
Jose Antonio Garcia (Californio bandit) a member of the Jack Powers Gang

See also 
José García Antonio (born 1947), Mexican potter
Jose Garcia (disambiguation)